Without Music the World Dies is the upcoming fourteenth solo studio album by English singer Morrissey. It has a tentative release date of late 2023.

Content 
Morrissey announced the tentative production and release of Without Music the World Dies on 8 December 2022. The album was recorded between January and February of 2023 at La Fabrique Studios in St-Remy, France, and was produced by Joe Chiccarelli, making it his fifth collaboration with the singer. The album was produced outside the bounds of a record contract, as Morrissey had parted ways with his former label Capitol Records in December of 2022. The album was initially scheduled to consist of twelve songs, which were collectively written by Morrissey and members of his band, although this was later reduced to ten songs. On 8 March 2023, "The Night Pop Dropped" and "Without Music the World Dies" debuted live in Salle Pleyel, Paris.

On 20 February 2023, Morrissey announced that Without Music the World Dies had been completed. He then offered the album up to any record labels or private investors who were willing to distribute the finished album.

Track listing

Personnel 
Personnel per Morrissey's website.
 Morrissey – vocals, songwriting

Additional personnel

 Jesse Tobias – guitars
 Gustavo Manzur – keyboards and backing vocals
 Alain Whyte – guitars and backing vocals
 Juan Galeano – bass
 Brendan Buckley – drums

Production

 Joe Chiccarelli – production
 Bill Mimms - engineering

References 

Morrissey albums
Upcoming albums
2023 albums
Albums produced by Joe Chiccarelli